Jonathan Pike (born 1949 in Leatherhead, Surrey) is an English painter.

An architectural painter, primarily a watercolourist, he also paints in oils. He specializes in views of Venice, Cuba, Rome, and Florence as well as London and Dublin.

His painting 'Rooftops' has been in the collection of the City of London Corporation since 1989.

In 2009 Jonathan Pike won first prize in The Royal Watercolour Society/Sunday Times Watercolour competition for his painting Monte Carlo. He received £12,000.

References

External links
 

1949 births
Living people
20th-century English painters
English male painters
21st-century English painters
People from Leatherhead
20th-century English male artists
21st-century English male artists